RE/Search No. 6/7: Industrial Culture Handbook from RE/Search Publications, 1983 is a book about industrial music and performance art edited by V. Vale and Andrea Juno.  It features interviews and articles with Throbbing Gristle, Mark Pauline, Cabaret Voltaire, NON, Monte Cazazza, Sordide Sentimental, SPK, Z'EV, Johanna Went and R&N. The book was re-released in 2006 in a new hardback edition.

References
 RE/Search No. 6/7: Industrial Culture Handbook, RE/Search Publications 1983, 
 RE/Search No. 6/7: Industrial Culture Handbook, Limited Hardback Edition, RE/Search Publications 2006,

External links
 Industrial Culture Handbook Page on RE/Search pubs

Music books
1983 non-fiction books